Valeria Luiselli (born August 16, 1983) is a Mexican author living in the United States. She is the author of the book of essays Sidewalks and the novel Faces in the Crowd, which won the Los Angeles Times Art Seidenbaum Award for First Fiction. Luiselli's 2015 novel The Story of My Teeth was a finalist for the National Book Critics Circle Award and the Best Translated Book Award, and won the Los Angeles Times Book Prize for Best Fiction, and she was awarded the Premio Metropolis Azul in Montreal, Quebec. Luiselli's books have been translated into more than 20 languages, with her work appearing in publications including, The New York Times, Granta, McSweeney's, and The New Yorker. Her most recent book, Tell Me How It Ends: An Essay in 40 Questions, was a finalist for the Kirkus Prize in Nonfiction and the National Book Critics Circle Award in Criticism. Luiselli's 2020 novel, Lost Children Archive won the Carnegie Medal for Excellence in Fiction.

In 2014, Luiselli was the recipient of the National Book Foundation's "5 under 35" award. In 2019, she won a MacArthur Fellowship, also known as a MacArthur "Genius Grant". In 2020, the Vilcek Foundation awarded her a Vilcek Prize for Creative Promise in Literature and the Folio Prize.

Luiselli is a member of the Inter-American Dialogue.

Career

After earning a bachelor's degree in Philosophy from the National Autonomous University of Mexico, Luiselli moved to New York City to dance. She eventually studied comparative literature at Columbia University, where she completed a Ph.D. She teaches literature and creative writing at Bard College, collaborates as a writer with a number of art galleries, and has worked as a librettist for the New York City Ballet. She served as a juror for the Neustadt International Prize for Literature in 2016.

Several of Luiselli's books are based in real-world experiences. The Story of My Teeth (2015) was first written in serial for workers in a Jumex juice factory in Mexico as part of a commission from Galería Jumex. Her nonfiction work Tell Me How It Ends: An Essay in 40 Questions (2017) is based on her experiences volunteering as an interpreter for young Central American migrants seeking legal status in the United States. The book was a finalist for the National Book Critics Circle Award in Criticism in 2017. Her work with asylum-seeking children from Latin America also informs the central theme in her 2019 novel Lost Children Archive.

Personal life
Luiselli was born in Mexico City, and moved to Madison, Wisconsin, with her family at the age of two. Her father's work in NGOs and later as a diplomat moved the family to Costa Rica, South Korea, and South Africa. After her parents separated, she moved to Mexico City with her mother at the age of 16. Luiselli attended UWC Mahindra College in India and then returned to Mexico to attend university. She enrolled in the National Autonomous University of Mexico to study philosophy, and then lived in Spain and France.

Luiselli first came to New York to study contemporary dance and worked as an intern at the United Nations, and later studied a PhD in Comparative Literature at Columbia University. She currently lives in the Bronx with her family.

Political involvement 
Luiselli started a literacy program for girls in a detention center in upstate New York that focuses on creative writing. Luiselli is passionate about researching and writing about mass incarceration in the United States, with a focus on detention centers. She is working on a performance piece with the poet Natalie Diaz related to mass incarceration and violence against women.

Luiselli has been interested in writing about and working to improve the plight of asylum-seeking children from Latin America, a theme that is present in her 2020 novel, Lost Children Archive. She began writing Lost Children Archive in 2014 "as a loudspeaker for all of [her] political rage" after having served as a court translator for children from Latin America involved in the migration crisis. The creation of this book was also a reaction to her daughter working to understand the migration crisis for herself. Before completing Lost Children Archive in 2019, Luiselli published Tell Me How It Ends: An Essay in 40 Questions that uses the format of the questions she used in the court when interviewing the children, and includes her own experience with applying for a green card. The time spent writing the essay allowed her to write Lost Children Archive with “more open questions and open ends instead of political stances that are too loud and obvious by themselves.”

Works

Sidewalks
Sidewalks is Luiselli's debut book of essays in which she explores themes of motion, travel, transition, and reflection.

Faces in the Crowd (Los ingrávidos)
Faces in the Crowd (2011) is a triptych that follows the perspectives of the narrator, a young mother living and working as a translator in New York, the protagonist of that mother's semi-autobiographical novel, and Gilberto Owen, a 20th-century Mexican poet. These three perspectives are woven together throughout the story.

The Story of My Teeth
Luiselli's second novel, The Story of My Teeth, tells the story of Gustavo (Highway) Sánchez Sánchez, an auctioneer who claims to sell the teeth of authors and historical figures, and uses the money to purchase the supposed teeth of Marilyn Monroe to replace his own. The Story of My Teeth was written in chapters and distributed to the workers of a juice factory in Mexico. The workers read the chapters out loud and provided comments on them, which Luiselli recorded and took into consideration as she wrote the next chapter.

Tell Me How It Ends: An Essay in 40 Questions
In this book, Luiselli draws from her experience working as an interpreter for Central American child migrants. The book links the experiences of migrant children risking their lives to come to the United States to Luiselli's own experiences of getting a green card and staying here with her family.

Lost Children Archive (Desierto sonoro)
Her fifth novel, this is the first to be written in English. She said she used it as a loudspeaker for all of her political rage regarding the migration crisis. Lost Children Archive follows a mother, father, and their two children on their journey driving from New York to Arizona in the heat of summer. On the way, they learn about the immigration crisis and learn that they may soon be in a crisis of their own.

Awards 
 2018 American Book Award for Tell Me How It Ends: An Essay in 40 Questions
 2019 MacArthur Fellowship
 2020 Vilcek Prize for Creative Promise in Literature, Vilcek Foundation 
2020 Folio Prize
2021 International Dublin Literary Award

Bibliography
 Papeles falsos (Sexto Piso, 2010). Translated by Christina MacSweeney as Sidewalks (2014)
 Los ingrávidos (Sexto Piso, 2010). Translated by Christina MacSweeney as Faces in the Crowd (2011)
 "Swings of Harlem", published in Where You Are: A Collection of Maps That Will Leave You Feeling Completely Lost (2013)
 La historia de mis dientes (2013). Translated by Christina MacSweeney as The Story of My Teeth (2015)
 Tell Me How It Ends: An Essay in 40 Questions (2016)
 Lost Children Archive (2019). Also translated into Spanish by the author and Daniel Saldaña París as Desierto sonoro (2019)

References

Further reading

External links

Interview with Jennifer Kabat in Bomb Magazine
RCW Website
Valeria Luiselli recorded at the Library of Congress for the Hispanic Division's audio literary archive in 2015

1983 births
Living people
Mexican women novelists
Writers from Mexico City
Columbia Graduate School of Arts and Sciences
National Autonomous University of Mexico alumni
21st-century Mexican writers
21st-century American women writers
21st-century Mexican women writers
American Book Award winners
People educated at a United World College
MacArthur Fellows
Mexican people of Italian descent
Members of the Inter-American Dialogue
O. Henry Award winners